Auguste Jal (12 April 1795, in Lyon – 5 April 1873) was a French author who wrote on maritime archaeology and history.

Biography
He was educated at the naval school in Brest, and led a company of the cadets in the defense of Paris during the Hundred Days (1815). His first literary work was published in the journals Le Fureteur, Le Miroir, and Le Pandore. Later he became well known as an art critic. In 1831 he received official charge of the marine archives.

Works
He became known as the author of numerous works on art, and especially on maritime archaeology. His works include:
 Scènes de la vie maritime ("Scenes from life at sea", 3 vols., Paris, 1832)
 Archéologie navale ("Naval archaeology", 2 vols., 1839) Written in connection with his administration of the marine archives.
 Glossaire nautique ("Nautical glossary", 1848) Written in connection with his administration of the marine archives. It won the second Gobert Prize.
 La flotte de César ("Caesar's fleet", 1861)
 Dictionnaire critique de biographie et d'histoire ("Critical dictionary of biography and history", 1864) Published with the goal of revising errors and of filling in gaps in encyclopedias.
 Dictionnaire critique de biographie et d'histoire, 2nd edition, 1872
 Souvenirs d'un homme de lettres (1877) His memoirs.

Notes

References

 

1795 births
Writers from Lyon
1873 deaths
19th-century French historians
French historiographers
Maritime historians
Officiers of the Légion d'honneur
Order of Vasa